The Anadolu Pony is a Turkish breed of horse developed over 1,000 years ago.  They are known for their speed, endurance and hardiness.

Characteristics 
The Anadolu is a small pony, standing between 12.1 and 13.3 hands high. The head is small and shows refinement. Both convex and concave profiles are found within the breed. The mouth is small and the nostrils are open and flexible, while the withers are somewhat low, the chest is narrow and the croup is sloped. Anadolu Pony is usually a brownish color, but can also have a black, grey, white and chestnut coat. Its mane will contrast its body coat and can range from fairly thick to thin depending on each specific pony. This information was pulled from a study done by Yilmaz, Orhan and Mehmet Ertuğrul on the frequencies of coat color on the species in Turkey.

Breed history 
The Anadolu Pony is descended from crosses of Turkoman, Arabian, Persian, Karabakh, Akhal-Teke, Karbada, Deliboz, Mongolian and the ancient Anatolia horse. Some books refer to this small pony as the Native Turkish Pony, or Turk, but Professors Salahattin Batu and M. Nurettin Aral made a distinction in types between the horses in Anatolia as Anadolu and East and Southeast Anadolu.

Anadolu can be translated as "Turkey on the Asia". This is the most numerous Turkish horse breed, with approximately 930,000 alive today.

Uses 
It is usually used as a riding horse and a pack horse, and is known to be strong, enduring and fast. It has been bred to live in poor conditions, and is today found throughout Turkey.

References

 Hendricks, Bonnie. International Encyclopedia of Horse Breeds page 27
 Yilmaz, Orhan, and Mehmet Ertuğrul. “Morphological Characterization in Ayvacik Pony: a Nearly Extinct Horse Breed in Turkey.” 2014, doi:10.13140/2.1.1855.9360.

Horse breeds
Horse breeds originating in Turkey